The SBL Cup is the national professional league cup competition that is organised by the Swiss Basketball League (SBL), which is the top-tier level basketball division in Switzerland. The competition was introduced in 2004, and is the second cup competition that SBL teams play in, along with the Federation Swiss Cup. Formerly, the competition was known as the Swiss Basketball League Cup.

Format
Six teams from a given SBL regular season qualify, with the two highest seeds having a bye in the quarter-finals. A final four tournament, at a host city, is played to determine the winner of the SBL Cup.

Finals

Key

2018–present

2004–2017

See also
 Swiss Basketball League (SBL)
 Swiss Basketball Cup (Federation Cup)

References

Basketball competitions in Switzerland
Basketball cup competitions in Europe